Tuesday's Children is a 501(c)(3) nonprofit organization whose mission is to provide a lifetime healing for families who have been forever changed by terrorism, military conflict or mass violence. Since 2001, Tuesday's Children has helped more than 42,000 individuals impacted by Tuesday, September 11, 2001 and other tragedies, including: families of 9/11 victims, responders and military service members; international youth; global victims of terrorism; and domestic and international communities impacted by mass violence, such as Newtown, CT, Parkland and Orlando, FL, Thousand Oaks, CA, Las Vegas, NV, Aurora, CO, and many others. Tuesday's Children has spent two decades providing trauma and grief support, mental health counseling, youth mentoring, skills-building workshops, parenting advisement, community and family engagement events, and volunteerism opportunities.

History
Tuesday's Children provides a lifetime of healing for families who have been forever changed by terrorism, military conflict or mass violence. Through a time-tested, long-term approach, Tuesday's Children programming serves and supports U.S. military Families of the Fallen; builds resilience and common bonds in communities worldwide recovering from tragedies; and keeps the promise to support all those impacted by Tuesday, September 11th.  

Since 2001, Tuesday's Children has served over 42,000 individuals through consistent and successful evidence–based programs–trauma and grief supports, youth mentoring, mental health services, skills-building workshops, career resources, parenting advisement, youth leadership development, community and family engagement events, and volunteerism opportunities. Tuesday's Children is proud to offer the same life-changing programs for Military Families of the Fallen as we did for those who lost a loved one on Tuesday, September 11th, 2001.

Service populations
Tuesday's Children's service population includes: 

 9/11 victims and responders 
 families of fallen post-9/11 military service members 
 international youth and global victims of terrorism and mass violence 
 local communities recovering from large-scale tragedies and mass violence 
 post-9/11 military children and families who have lost a service member, regardless of cause of death, branch of service, status of duty, discharge status or geographic location 
 teenagers and young adults from around the world who have lost a loved one to terrorism, violent extremism or war (Project COMMON BOND)

Long-Term Healing Model
Tuesday's Children enables families and communities torn apart by tragedy to heal, recover and thrive for a lifetime. The organization's evidence-based Long-Term Healing Model is a proven approach to bringing families out of isolation by featuring safe, supportive and adaptive programming that strengthens resilience and builds community among individuals with common bonds. Trust is the foundation of Tuesday's Children organizational strategy, and its approach of meeting families where they are in their post-loss recovery has proven to effectively engage families, and keep them engaged to address their changing needs over time. 

Leveraging its Long-Term Healing Model, Tuesday's Children shares best practices and lessons learned in recovery and resilience with communities impacted by terrorism, military conflict, mass violence and traumatic loss at home and abroad. TuesdaysChildrenHeal.org, an online toolkit for community resilience, offers a training curriculum and a range of resources for providing tragedy assistance and support services to families and children impacted by traumatic events. Tuesday's Children continues to broaden its impact by building coalition and peer network and learning from other domestic and international communities, survivors, service providers, government agencies and family support networks in response to wide-scale trauma and loss, military conflict and mass violence.

Project COMMON BOND

Publications
The Legacy Letters were published by Tuesday's Children, edited by New York Times best-selling author Brian Curtis, and feature a compilation of a hundred letters of family members to their loved ones lost in 9/11. The ISBN number is 0399537082.

Fundraising
Major sponsors for Tuesday's Children include Allstate Insurance, American Red Cross, Bank of America, Goldman Sachs, NASDAQ, the New York Stock Exchange, the New York Mets,  the New York Giants, State Farm, and other notably large corporations. Other supporters include, Warner Brothers, Bank of America, CNN, CBS, Cosmopolitan Magazine, Condé Nast, L'oreal, Louis Vuitton, Michael Kors, Macy's, The New York Times, TD Bank, American Airlines, Ralph Lauren, NFL, NHL, Visa, and MasterCard.

References

Aftermath of the September 11 attacks